Green Mountain or Green Mountains may refer to:

Mountains
 Green Mountain, the main peak on Ascension Island
 Green Mountain (Libya) (Jebel Akhdar), a forested upland area in Cyrenaica in eastern Libya
 Green Mountain (Oman), (Jebel Akhdar), part of the Al Hajar mountain range in Oman
 Green Mountain (Boulder, Colorado), a mountain in Boulder, Colorado
 Green Mountain (Lakewood, Colorado), a mountain in the western suburbs of Denver
 Green Mountain (Kenosha Mountains), a mountain in the Pike National Forest of Jefferson County, Colorado
 Green Mountain (King County, Washington), a mountain near Mount Si
 Green Mountain (Kitsap County, Washington), a mountain on the Kitsap Peninsula in Western Washington
 Green Mountain (Snohomish County, Washington), a mountain in the Cascade Mountains of Washington
 A nickname of Mount Carmel (ההר הירוק)
 Green Mountains, the range of mountains in the middle of Vermont

Populated places
 Green Mountain, New Brunswick, a rural community in York County, New Brunswick, Canada
 Green Mountain Falls, Colorado, U.S.
 Green Mountain, Iowa, U.S.
 Green Mountain, North Carolina, U.S.
 Zielona Góra, Poland

Other uses
 Green Mountain College, a former private liberal arts college in Poultney, Vermont
 Green Mountain High School, in Lakewood, Colorado
 Green Mountain Lake, a lake in Minnesota
 Green Mountain line, a light rail line in Taiwan
 Green Mountain Railroad, a railroad operating in Vermont
 Green Mountain Reservoir, in Colorado along the Blue River

See also
 Green Mountain Coffee, a brand of coffee
 
 Mountain Green, Utah
 Monte Verde, an archaeological site in southern Chile
 Monteverde (disambiguation)